National Bank of Coatesville Building, also known as the Industrial Valley Bank Building, is a historic bank building located at Coatesville, Chester County, Pennsylvania.  It was built between 1906 and 1908, and is a four-story, steel-frame structure faced in buff-colored brick and Indiana Limestone in an eclectic Late Victorian style.  It measures 70 feet by 140 feet, and is trimmed in terra cotta and Indiana limestone.  It features a clock tower with rounded dome framing. In addition to the bank, the building once housed the post office.  The building has been converted to apartments.

It was added to the National Register of Historic Places in 1977.

References

Bank buildings on the National Register of Historic Places in Pennsylvania
Commercial buildings completed in 1908
Buildings and structures in Chester County, Pennsylvania
Coatesville, Pennsylvania
National Register of Historic Places in Chester County, Pennsylvania
1908 establishments in Pennsylvania